Mike Jones (born 1971) is an American screenwriter and journalist. He serves as the Senior Story and Creative Artist at Pixar Animation Studios and is a writer on the studio's animated feature films Soul and Luca.

Career
Jones was born in San Antonio, Texas, and graduated from New York University's Tisch School of the Arts for film. He began his career as an entertainment journalist working as Filmmaker Magazines Managing Editor and IndieWire's Executive Editor.

His first screenplay, EvenHand, was produced in 2001 and screened at the AFI Film Festival, Tribeca Film Festival, and South by Southwest.

Jones did an uncredited rewrite of City of Ghosts, directed by Matt Dillon, and has since written scripts for Columbia Pictures, United Artists, HBO, Warner Bros. Pictures, Sony Pictures Animation, Fox Searchlight, and Metro-Goldwyn-Mayer.

During the 2007-2008 Writers Guild of America strike he became the Managing Editor of Film Festivals for Variety, where he covered the film festival and independent film beats in Variety, Daily Variety, and in a blog called The Circuit.

In 2011, his script In the Event of a Moon Disaster was featured on The Black List and optioned by FilmNation Entertainment.

In 2013–2014, Jones wrote the English adaptations of Studio Ghibli films The Wind Rises and The Tale of Princess Kaguya, as well as a feature adaptation of Sesame Street.

References

External links

 Mike Jones on Facebook

1971 births
American male screenwriters
American male journalists
Annie Award winners
Living people
Pixar people
Screenwriters from Texas
Tisch School of the Arts alumni